Malik Ahmad Yar Hunjra is a Pakistani politician who was a Member of the Provincial Assembly of the Punjab, from 2002 to May 2018.

Early life and education
He was born on 6 March 1978 in Muzaffargarh District.

He graduated from Government College University where he was enrolled between 1997 and 2000. He obtained the degree of Master of Business Administration in Finance from Quaid-i-Azam University in 2003 and graduated in Law from Bahauddin Zakariya University. He has the degree of Bachelor of Laws. He belongs to a political family of South Punjab whose head is  Sultan Mehmood Hunjra

Political career
He was elected to the Provincial Assembly of the Punjab as a candidate of Pakistan Muslim League (Q) (PML-Q) from Constituency PP-251 (Muzaffargarh-I) in 2002 Pakistani general election. He received 21,695 votes and defeated Mufti Abdul Jalil, a candidate of Muttahida Majlis-e-Amal (MMA). In the same election, he ran for the seat of the National Assembly of Pakistan as an independent candidate from Constituency NA-176 (Muzaffargarh-I) but was unsuccessful. He received 2,823 votes and lost the seat to Khalida Mohsin Ali Qureshi, a candidate of Pakistan Peoples Party (PPP).

He was re-elected to the Provincial Assembly of the Punjab as a candidate of PML-Q from Constituency PP-251 (Muzaffargarh-I) in 2008 Pakistani general election. He received 19,913 votes and defeated Malik Muhammad Yousaf Hinjra, a candidate of PPP.

He was re-elected to the Provincial Assembly of the Punjab as a candidate of Pakistan Muslim League (N) from Constituency PP-251 (Muzaffargarh-I) in 2013 Pakistani general election. He received 33,502 votes and defeated Muhammad Ashraf Khan Rind, a candidate of Pakistan Tehreek-e-Insaf (PTI). In November 2016, he was inducted into the provincial Punjab cabinet of Chief Minister Shehbaz Sharif and was made Provincial Minister of Punjab for Prisons.

References

Living people
Punjab MPAs 2013–2018
1978 births
Pakistan Muslim League (N) politicians
Punjab MPAs 2002–2007
Punjab MPAs 2008–2013